Gu Gai (born 16 May 1989) is a former Chinese para table tennis player who was a triple Paralympic champion in team events, a double World champion in teams events and a four-time Asian champion in both team events. Gu won team event titles along with Zhang Bian and Zhou Ying.

Like many of her teammates, Gu was a polio victim from Pizhou who attended New Hope Center as a child. That's where coach Heng Xin developed her into a star.

Personal life
Gu Gai is married to her national teammate Feng Panfeng. They have a son together.

References

Living people
Sportspeople from Suzhou
Paralympic table tennis players of China
Table tennis players at the 2004 Summer Paralympics
Table tennis players at the 2008 Summer Paralympics
Table tennis players at the 2012 Summer Paralympics
Table tennis players at the 2016 Summer Paralympics
Medalists at the 2008 Summer Paralympics
Medalists at the 2012 Summer Paralympics
Medalists at the 2016 Summer Paralympics
Paralympic gold medalists for China
Paralympic silver medalists for China
Paralympic medalists in table tennis
Para table tennis players from Pizhou
People with polio
1989 births
Chinese female table tennis players
FESPIC Games competitors
20th-century Chinese women
21st-century Chinese women